Vice Erak (born 12 January 2001) is a Croatian professional water polo player. He is currently playing for VK Solaris. He is 6 ft 5 in (1.96 m) tall and weighs 207 lb (94 kg). His brother, Karlo Erak, is also water polo player.

References

2001 births
Living people
Croatian male water polo players
Sportspeople from Šibenik